Gaud Malhar is a raga in Hindustani classical music that combines characteristics of Malhar and the now extinct raga named Gaud.

References

Hindustani ragas